Phytoecia stenostoloides is a species of beetle in the family Cerambycidae. It was described by Stephan von Breuning in 1943. It is known from Siberia.

References

Phytoecia
Beetles described in 1943